Anthony Veselovsky (7 March 1865 – 1939) was an Imperial Russian division, corps and army commander.

Awards
Order of Saint Stanislaus (House of Romanov), 2nd class, 1892
Order of Saint Anna, 2nd class, 1909
Order of Saint Vladimir, 4th class, 1912
Order of Saint Vladimir, 3rd class, 1914
Order of Saint George, 4th degree, 1915
Gold Sword for Bravery (Saint George Sword), 1915
Order of Saint George, 3rd degree, 1915
Order of Saint Stanislaus (House of Romanov), 1st class, 1915
Order of Saint Anna, 1st class, 1915
Order of Saint Vladimir, 2nd class, 1916
Order of the White Eagle (Russian Empire), 1917

Bibliography
 Варшавско-Ивангородская операция. Сборник документов мировой империалистической войны на русском фронте (1914—1917). М., 1938.
 «Военный орден святого великомученика и победоносца Георгия. Биобиблиографический справочник» РГВИА, М., 2004.
 Волков С. В. Генералитет Российской империи: Энциклопедический словарь генералов и адмиралов от Петра I до Николая II, в 2-х т. Центрполиграф: Москва, 2009.
 Список старшим войсковым начальникам, начальникам штабов: округов, корпусов и дивизий и командирам отдельных строевых частей. С.-Петербург. Военная Типография. 1913.
 Список генералам по старшинству. Составлен по 15.04.1914. Петроград, 1914
 Список генералам по старшинству. Составлен по 10.07.1916. Петроград, 1916
 Сухарева О. В. Кто был кто в России. — М., АСТ., 2005. —

External links
 
 Головин Н. Н. Дни перелома Галицийской битвы.
 Керсновский А. А. История Русской армии
 Генерал А. А. Веселовский (на страницах газеты «Биржевые ведомости» 1916

Russian military personnel of World War I
Recipients of the Order of Saint Stanislaus (Russian), 2nd class
Recipients of the Order of St. Anna, 2nd class
Recipients of the Order of St. Vladimir, 4th class
Recipients of the Order of St. Vladimir, 3rd class
Recipients of the Gold Sword for Bravery
Recipients of the Order of St. George of the Third Degree
Recipients of the Order of Saint Stanislaus (Russian), 1st class
Recipients of the Order of St. Anna, 1st class
Recipients of the Order of St. Vladimir, 2nd class
Recipients of the Order of the White Eagle (Russia)
1865 births
1939 deaths